Marthe Dupont-Trasenster (née Trasenster; 30 March 1892 – 15 November 1979) was a Belgian tennis player.

Career
She represented Belgium in the 1920 Summer Olympics and in the 1924 Summer Olympics. She was also a Belgian national tennis champion in 1921 and 1930.

Personal life
In 1911, Marthe married a Belgian sport shooter, Émile Dupont who won a silver medal in the 1920 Summer Olympics and also participated in the 1924 Summer Olympics representing Belgium.

Her sister-in-law, Marguerite Chaudoir, was also a Belgian tennis player.

References 

1892 births
1979 deaths
Belgian female tennis players
Tennis players at the 1920 Summer Olympics
Tennis players at the 1924 Summer Olympics
Olympic tennis players of Belgium
Sportspeople from Liège
20th-century Belgian women